Edward Albert Officer (29 March 1869 – 10 June 1927) was an Australian rules footballer who played for the Essendon Football Club in both the Victorian Football Association (VFA) and the Victorian Football League (VFL).

In his first four seasons, he played in Essendon's successive premierships, and played in a fifth in the first year of the VFL competition under the captaincy of good friend George Stuckey. Officer made his VFL debut against  in Round 1 of the season, at Corio Oval.

After retiring from football, Officer moved to Perth and practiced as a physician until his death in 1927.

References

External links

Officer, Ned; Past Player Profiles, Essendon Football Club
 

1869 births
1927 deaths
Essendon Football Club players
Essendon Football Club Premiership players
Warrnambool Football Club players
Australian rules footballers from Victoria (Australia)
People from Warrnambool
One-time VFL/AFL Premiership players